Statistics of League of Ireland in the 1965/1966 season.

Overview
It was contested by 12 teams, and Waterford won the championship.

Final classification

Results

Top scorers

League of Ireland seasons
Ireland
1965–66 in Republic of Ireland association football